Dumasia is a genus of flowering plants in the legume family, Fabaceae.

It belongs to the subfamily Faboideae.

References 

Phaseoleae
Fabaceae genera
Taxa named by Augustin Pyramus de Candolle